Timberlane (locally known as Timberline) is a village in Boone County, Illinois, United States. It is part of the Rockford, Illinois Metropolitan Statistical Area. The population was 906 at the 2020 census.

History
Timberlane was incorporated as a village in 1995.

Geography
Timberlane is located at  (42.332313, -88.857270).

Demographics

As of the 2020 census there were 906 people, 345 households, and 319 families residing in the village. The racial makeup of the village was 86.87% White, 3.20% African American, 1.88% Asian, 1.88% from other races, and 6.18% from two or more races. Hispanic or Latino of any race were 7.84% of the population.

There were 345 households, out of which 70.14% had children under the age of 18 living with them, 82.90% were married couples living together, 5.22% had a female householder with no husband present, and 7.54% were non-families. 6.38% of all households were made up of individuals, and 3.48% had someone living alone who was 65 years of age or older. The average household size was 3.48 and the average family size was 3.36.

The village's age distribution consisted of 21.5% under the age of 18, 18.0% from 18 to 24, 14.2% from 25 to 44, 40.2% from 45 to 64, and 6.0% who were 65 years of age or older. The median age was 43.2 years. For every 100 females, there were 82.6 males. For every 100 females age 18 and over, there were 74.1 males.

The median income for a household in the village was $170,875, and the median income for a family was $171,625. Males had a median income of $100,527 versus $55,139 for females. The per capita income for the village was $55,343. About 2.2% of families and 2.0% of the population were below the poverty line, including 0.8% of those under age 18 and 5.7% of those age 65 or over.

References

Villages in Boone County, Illinois
Villages in Illinois
Rockford metropolitan area, Illinois
1995 establishments in Illinois